The Human Parechovirus 1 cis regulatory element is an RNA element which is located in the 5'-terminal 112 nucleotides of the genome of human parechovirus 1 (HPeV1). The element consists of two stem-loop structures (SL-A and SL-B) together with a pseudoknot. Disruption of any of these elements impairs both viral replication and growth.

See also 
Human rhinovirus internal cis-acting regulatory element (CRE)
Rotavirus cis-acting replication element (CRE)
Parechovirus

References

External links 
 

Cis-regulatory RNA elements